El Mundo de los Aviones is a 1969 Mexican film comedy starring Gaspar "Capulina" Henaine, Lucy Gallardo and Enrique Rambal.

Plot
Capulina is a pilot who is erratic at best, never being able to land his airplane correctly. However, he discovers a plot being planned in the airline industry and unites his airline friends in order to prevent  it from happening.

External links
 

1969 films
Mexican comedy films
Aviation films
1960s Mexican films